Elections in Manipur are conducted since 1952 to elect the members for Manipur Legislative Assembly and Lok Sabha. There are 60 assembly constituencies and 2 Lok Sabha constituencies.

Assembly Elections

1967

1972

1974

1980

1984

1990

1995

2000

2002

2007

2012

2017

2022

Lok Sabha elections 
The elections held in Manipur for Lok Sabha are listed below.

See also
List of constituencies of the Manipur Legislative Assembly

References